The Future of Children is a biannual academic journal published by the Princeton School of Public and International Affairs at Princeton University and the Brookings Institution. It focuses on providing policy makers with the best available information about policies and programs regarding children.

References

External links
The Future of Children

Child welfare
Princeton University publications
Publications established in 1991
Biannual journals
English-language journals
Policy analysis journals